L'Héritage des Celtes (The Celts Heritage) is a 50-piece Pan-Celt band with musicians from Celtic nations, started by two Bretons in the town of Quimper ; the producer Jacques Bernard and the guitarist Dan Ar Braz. It started as a gathering of friends to celebrate the 70th anniversary of Festival de Cornouaille in 1993. The adventure surpassed all expectations: 2.5 million albums sold, thousands of spectators in biggest stages of France (Bercy, Zéniths, stadiums, festivals) and two Victoires de la Musique awards in 1996 and 1998 (best album of traditional music). Their fame within France was so great that in 1996 they represented France in the 41st Eurovision Song Contest. In August 2000 the group played at the Festival Interceltique in Lorient where Dan Ar Braz announced that it would be the final concert.

Discography 
 Héritage des Celtes (1994)
 En concert Live (1995)
 Finisterres (1997)
 Zenith (1998)
 Bretagnes à Bercy (1999) (various artists)
 Nuit Celtique au Stade de France (2002) (various artists)

References

External links 
 Discogs.com

Musical groups established in 1993
Celtic fusion groups
Celtic rock groups
Breton musical groups
French folk music groups
Eurovision Song Contest entrants of 1996
Eurovision Song Contest entrants for France